Mero Badloo (Rajasthani: मेरो बदळो,  English: My Revenge)  is a Rajasthani action/drama film produced and directed by Mahendra Gaur. The film was released on 19 June 2015. The film stars Mahendra Gaur with Teena Rathore, Swati Jaiswal and Murarilal Pareek, Gaurav Pareek in supporting roles.

Summary 
Mero Badloo film is based on portrays a drug mafia in Rajasthan. in this movie, Mahendra Gaur Is the lead actor and director of this movie. this movie launched only in Rajasthan cinemas.

Cast 
 Mahendra Gaur – Shiva
 Murari Lal Pareek – Parvati
 Gaurav Pareek - Guri
 Swati Jaiswal – Gauri
 HISAM KHAN – TM               
 Pankai Punia – Bhinvraj        
 Rudra Gaur – Child Artist
 Murari Lal Pareek - chattur
 Gopal Prasad - Balveer

Soundtrack

References 

Rajasthani-language films
2015 films
Rajasthani culture
Non-Assamese-language films with Assamese connection